Pavel Nikolayevich Kuznetsov (born 12 July 2002) is a Russian football player. He plays for FC Shinnik Yaroslavl.

Club career
He made his debut in the Russian Football National League for FC Shinnik Yaroslavl on 9 October 2020 in a game against FC Dynamo Bryansk.

References

External links
 Profile by Russian Football National League
 

2002 births
Living people
Russian footballers
Association football midfielders
FC Shinnik Yaroslavl players
Russian First League players
Russian Second League players